Chains Are Broken is the sixth studio album by American band The Devil Makes Three. It was released on August 24, 2018, through New West Records.

Track listing

Charts

Personnel
The Devil Makes Three
Pete Bernhard – Composer, Fender Jazz Bass, Guitar, Lead Vocals
Lucia Turino – Bass, Backing Vocals
Cooper McBean – Fender Jazz Bass, Guitar, Guitar (Baritone), Backing Vocals

Additional musician
Stefan Amidon – Drums, Harmonium, Mellotron, Percussion, Piano, Backing Vocals
Ted Hutt – Mixing, Percussion, Producer
Ryan Mall – Engineer, Mixing

References

2018 albums
New West Records albums